The 61st United States Colored Infantry was an infantry regiment that served in the Union Army during the American Civil War. The regiment was composed of African American enlisted men commanded by white officers and was authorized by the Bureau of Colored Troops which was created by the United States War Department on May 22, 1863. The non-commissioned officers (sergeants and corporals) and enlisted men were African Americans.  The regiment was originally organized as the 2nd Tennessee Volunteer Infantry (African Descent) and was also referred to as the 2nd West Tennessee Infantry Regiment (African Descent).

Organization
The regiment was organized at La Grange, Tennessee in June 1863 as the 2nd Tennessee Volunteer Infantry (African Descent) and assigned to the XVI Corps (Union Army). Recruits were mustered in on June 30 and August 27, 1863 and the regiment was utilized for garrison and guard duty in La Grange, Moscow and Memphis, Tennessee.

Service
An order was issued on September 16, 1863 at La Grange from the Headquarters of the 2nd Division, XVI Corps commanding that the "2nd West Tennessee (African Descent) will proceed to Moscow, Tennessee to relieve the 7th Iowa Volunteers." In the first engagement fought by any Tennessee USCT unit, the regiment was involved in a skirmish at Moscow on December 3, 1863, and the following day in the skirmish at Wolf River Bridge, where they thwarted attempts by Confederate cavalry under General Stephen D. Lee to burn the railroad bridge over the Wolf River.

Reorganization
The regiment was reorganized on March 11, 1864, in Memphis, and re-designated the 61st United States Colored Infantry.

The 61st was part of Major-General A. J. Smith's Expedition to Tupelo, Mississippi July 5–21, 1864. On July 13, as part of the rearguard of Smith's column they were involved in an engagement known as Camargo's Cross Roads (or Burrow's Shop to Confederates). The next day at Harrisburg, near Tupelo, Mississippi, the regiment participated in the Union victory over confederate forces under Major-General Nathan Bedford Forrest at the Battle of Tupelo. In this campaign the 61st lost one officer and seven enlisted men killed, with four officers and 28 enlisted men wounded and 16 enlisted men missing.

Most of the regiment participated in Smith's expedition to Oxford, Mississippi, August 1–30, 1864, and the regiment saw action at Waterford, Mississippi August 16–17, 1864 and at Castpool. A detachment of five officers and 200 enlisted men under Captain Charles Riggs, which had stayed behind during the Oxford expedition, was camped near Memphis and surprised and overrun by Forrest's troops at the Second Battle of Memphis on August 21, 1864, losing three men killed, eight wounded, and five missing.

The regiment was ordered to New Orleans, Louisiana, February 23, 1865 and then to Morganza, Louisiana. On March 17 they were sent to Fort Barrancas, near Pensacola, Florida, and from there were ordered to Blakely, Alabama on April 15, where they finished out their service.

Mustered out of service
The regiment was mustered out on December 30, 1865.

The regimental losses during service totaled 356: 1 Officer and 37 enlisted men killed and mortally wounded and 2 Officers and 316 enlisted men by disease.

See also

 List of United States Colored Troops Civil War Units
 List of Tennessee Union Civil War units
 United States Colored Troops

References

External links
 The War of the Rebellion: a Compilation of the Official Records of the Union and Confederate Armies
The Civil War Archive

United States Colored Troops Civil War units and formations
Units and formations of the Union Army from Tennessee
1863 establishments in Tennessee
1865 disestablishments in Tennessee
Military units and formations established in 1863
Military units and formations disestablished in 1865